General der Flieger was a General of the branch rank of the Luftwaffe (air force) in Nazi Germany. Until the end of World War II in 1945, this particular general officer rank was on three-star level (OF-8), equivalent to a US Lieutenant general.

The "General of the branch" ranks of the Luftwaffe were in 1945:
 General of parachute troops
 General of anti-aircraft artillery
 General of the aviators
 General of air force communications troops
 General of the air force

The rank was equivalent to the General of the branch ranks of the Heer (army) as follows:
Heer
 General of artillery
 General of mountain troops
 General of infantry
 General of cavalry
 General of the communications troops
 General of panzer troops (armoured troops)
 General of engineers
 General of the medical corps
 General of the veterinary corps

Other services
The rank was also equivalent to the German three-star ranks:
 Admiral of the Kriegsmarine, equivalent to (US Vice admiral) and
 SS-Obergruppenführer und General der Waffen-SS in the Waffen-SS.

List of officers who were General der Flieger

A 
 Alexander Andrae (1888–1979)

B 
 Karl Barlen (1890–1956)
 Hellmuth Bieneck (1887–1972)
 Karl-Heinrich Bodenschatz (1890–1979)
 Walter Boenicke (1895–1947)
 Rudolf Bogatsch (1891–1970)
 Alfred Bülowius (1892–1968)

C 
 Friedrich Christiansen (1879–1972)
 Friedrich Cochenhausen (1879–1946)
 Joachim Coeler (1891–1955)

D 
 Heinrich Danckelmann (1887–1947)
 Paul Deichmann (1898–1981)
 Egon Doerstling (1890–1965)
 Eduard Dransfeld (1883–1964)
 Karl Drum (1893–1968)

E 
 Karl Eberth (1877–1952)

F 
 Hellmuth Felmy (1885–1965)
 Martin Fiebig (1891–1947)
 Johannes Fink (1895–1981)
 Veit Fischer (1890–1966)
 Helmuth Förster (1889–1965)
 Stefan Fröhlich (1889–1978)
 Heribert Fütterer (1894–1963)

G 
 Hans Geisler (1891–1966)
 Ulrich Grauert (1889–1941) later promoted to Generaloberst

H 
 Wilhelm Haehnelt (1875–1946)
 Hans Halm (1879–1957)
 Friedrich-Carl Hanesse (1892–1975)
 Willi Harmjanz (1893–1983)
 Otto Hoffmann von Waldau (1898–1943)

J 
 Hans Jeschonnek (1899–1943), then a Generaloberst (1942)

K 
 Josef Kammhuber (1896–1986)
 Erich Karlewski (1874–1947)
 Gustav Kastner-Kirdorf (1881–1945)
 Leonhard Kaupisch (1878–1945)
 Albert Kesselring (1885–1960) later promoted to Generalfeldmarschall
 Ulrich Kessler (1894–1983)
 Karl Kitzinger (1886–1962)
 Waldemar Klepke (1882–1945)
 Robert Knauss (1892–1955)
 Karl Koller (1898–1951)
 Werner Kreipe (1904–1967)

L 
 Otto Langemeyer (1883–1950)
 Hermann von der Lieth-Thomsen (1867–1942)

M 
 Alfred Mahnke (1888–1979)
 Wilhelm Mayer (1886–1950)
 Rudolf Meister (1897–1958)
 Erhard Milch (1892–1972) later promoted to Generalfeldmarschall
 Max Mohr (1884–1966)
 Walter Musshoff (1885–1971)

P 
 Erich Petersen (1889–1963)
 Kurt Pflugbeil (1890–1955)
 Maximilian Ritter von Pohl (1893–1951)
 Richard Putzier (1890–1979)

Q 
 Erich Quade (1883–1959)

R 
 Georg Rieke (1894–1970)
 Hans Ritter (1893–1991)

S 
 Hugo Schmidt (1885–1964)
 Wilhelm Schubert (1879–1972)
 Julius Schulz (1889–1975)
 Karl Friedrich Schweickhard (1883–1968)
 Hans-Georg von Seidel (1891–1955)
 Hans Seidemann (1902–1967)
 Hans Siburg (1893–1976)
 Wilhelm Speidel (1895–1970)

V 
 Albert Vierling (1887–1969)

W 
 Bernhard Waber (1884–1945)
 Walther Wecke (1885–1943)
 Rudolf Wenninger (1890–1945)
 Helmuth Wilberg (1880–1941)
 Wilhelm Wimmer (1889–1973)
 Bodo von Witzendorff (1876–1943)
 Ludwig Wolff (1886–1950)

Z 
 Konrad Zander (1883–1947)

See also 

General (Germany)
Comparative officer ranks of World War II

Military ranks of Germany
Three-star officers of Nazi Germany
 
Lists of generals